Gabriel Agustín Aranda (born 16 April 2001) is an Argentine footballer currently playing as a centre-back for Boca Juniors.

Palmarés

Club

Notes

Honours
Boca Juniors
Primera División: 2022
Copa de la Liga Profesional: 2022
Supercopa Argentina: 2022

References

2001 births
Living people
Footballers from Buenos Aires
Argentine footballers
Association football defenders
Argentine Primera División players
Boca Juniors footballers
People from Ezeiza, Buenos Aires